Tatiana Alekseyevna Kusayko (3 January 1961, Butenki, Kobeliaky Raion) is a Russian political figure. She was a member of the Federation Council between 2016 and 2021 and deputy of the 8th State Duma since 2021.

In 1983, Kusayko graduated from the Kharkiv National Medical University and went to Murmansk to work in a local hospital. In June 2011, she was appointed chief physician of the municipal budgetary healthcare institution "Children's Polyclinic No. 1" in Murmansk. From 2014 to 2016, she was a deputy of the Council of Deputies of the city of Murmansk. In 2016, Kusayko became a member of the All-Russia People's Front central office. On 18 September 2016, she was elected a deputy of the Murmansk Oblast Duma of the 6th convocation for United Russia. In 2016, she ran for the 7th State Duma but was not elected. Instead on 6 October 2016 she was appointed to the Federation Council. In 2021, she was elected for the 8th State Duma.

References

1960 births
Living people
United Russia politicians
21st-century Russian politicians
Eighth convocation members of the State Duma (Russian Federation)
Members of the Federation Council of Russia (after 2000)